Wildewood is a planned community and census-designated place (CDP) in St. Mary's County, Maryland, United States.

Wildewood was first listed as a CDP prior to the 2020 census which listed a population of 7,821.

Demographics

2020 census

Note: the US Census treats Hispanic/Latino as an ethnic category. This table excludes Latinos from the racial categories and assigns them to a separate category. Hispanics/Latinos can be of any race.

References 

Census-designated places in St. Mary's County, Maryland
Census-designated places in Maryland